The Arkansas Derby is an American flat Thoroughbred horse race for three-year-olds held annually in April at Oaklawn Park in Hot Springs, Arkansas. It is currently a Grade I race run over a distance of 1 1/8 miles (9 furlongs) on dirt.

In 2004, to celebrate its 100th anniversary, Oaklawn Park offered a $5 million bonus to any horse that could sweep its three-year-old graded stakes, the Rebel Stakes and the Arkansas Derby, and then take the Kentucky Derby. Smarty Jones's collected the bonus. The exposure from Smarty Jones subsequent run at the Triple Crown helped increase participation from the top three-year-olds in the country to the point where the American Graded Stakes Committee made the Arkansas Derby a Grade I race in 2010.

Past winners of the race have gone on to win legs of horse racing's Grand Slam. Sunny's Halo won the 1983 Kentucky Derby, as did Smarty Jones in 2004 and American Pharoah in 2015. Elocutionist (1976), Tank's Prospect (1985), Pine Bluff (1992), Smarty Jones (2004), Afleet Alex (2005), Curlin (2007), and American Pharoah (2015) all won the Preakness Stakes.  1980 winner Temperence Hill, 1998's Victory Gallop, 2005's Afleet Alex, and 2015's American Pharoah all went on to capture the Belmont Stakes, as did Creator in 2016.  The 1994 winner, Concern, won that year's Breeders' Cup Classic.

The most celebrated Arkansas Derby champion is American Pharoah, who became the 12th Triple Crown winner and the first Triple Crown winner in 37 years. He is the first Arkansas Derby champion to win the Triple Crown. Like Smarty Jones, he too swept the Rebel and Arkansas Derby before winning the Kentucky Derby. The 2021 Arkansas Derby champion is Super Stock.

Prior to American Pharoah's 2015 Triple Crown, Curlin had been the most decorated Arkansas Derby Winner, after winning races that included the 2007 Preakness Stakes, the 2007 Breeders' Cup Classic, and the 2008 Dubai World Cup. For his efforts, Curlin won the Eclipse Award in both 2007 and 2008 for American Horse of the Year, the highest honor given in American thoroughbred horse racing. Curlin was later admitted to thoroughbred racing's National Museum of Racing and Hall of Fame.

The inaugural Arkansas Derby in 1936 offered a total purse of $5,000. The first winner was Holl Image, who was owned and trained by Jack Carter.

The race was run in two divisions in 1960, and again in 2020.  The 2020 race was moved to May 2, 2020 because of the COVID-19 pandemic, as the Kentucky Derby had been moved to September. Both races will pay identical points towards Kentucky Derby eligibility.

Records
Speed  record:
 1:46.80 – Althea (1984)

Most wins by a jockey:
 3 – Pat Day (1986, 1987, 1997)

Most wins by a trainer:
 5 – Todd Pletcher (2000, 2001, 2013, 2014, 2018)

Most wins by an owner:
 3 – Loblolly Stable (1980, 1987, 1992)

Winners of the Arkansas Derby since 1936 

1Charlatan was originally disqualified from his win due to a medication violation. The disqualification was later overturned on appeal.

2 In 1999, Valhol originally finished first but was relegated to last place following a Stewards' Inquiry.

See also
Arkansas Derby "top three finishers" and starters
Road to the Kentucky Derby

References

External links
Ten Things You Should Know About the Arkansas Derby at Hello Race Fans!

Horse races in Arkansas
Oaklawn Park
Flat horse races for three-year-olds
Triple Crown Prep Races
Grade 1 stakes races in the United States
Graded stakes races in the United States
Recurring sporting events established in 1936
1936 establishments in Arkansas